Australia at the 1930 British Empire Games was represented by a handful of athletes and abbreviated AUS.

Australia was one of only eleven countries to be represented at these inaugural Games.

At these first Games, Australia won only eight medals against England's 61. The Australians' return home was delayed because the RMS Tahiti on which they were due to travel sank during the Games.

Medallists

1930 Australian Team & Results

Athletics
Men's 440 Yard Run/Quarter Mile
 George Augustus Golding - Bronze, 49.6 s (in heat)
 Herbert Alexander Bascombe - 6th, 49.4 s (in heat)

Men's 880 Yard Run/Half Mile
 Herbert Alexander Bascombe - 5th in Heat 1
 George Augustus Golding - Did Not Finish

Men's 1 Mile Run
 William "Tickle" Miller Whyte - Silver, 4 min 17.0 s
 Russell McDougall - 7th

Men's 2 Mile Steeplechase
 Alex John Hillhouse - Silver

Men's 3 Mile Run
 Alex John Hillhouse - Silver, 14 min 27.6 s

Men's 6 Mile Run
 Alex John Hillhouse - Did Not Start

Men's 4 x 110 Yard Relay
 Australia - Did Not Start

Boxing
Men's Middleweight Division (75 kg)
 Dudley C. Gallagher - Silver

Rowing
Men's Singles Sculls
 Robert Pearce - Gold

Swimming
Men's 100 Yards Backstroke
 (Ivan) William Cameron - 4th

Men's 100 Yards Freestyle
 (Ivan) William Cameron - 4th

Men's 1500 Yards Freestyle
 Noel Phillip Ryan - Gold, 18 min 55.4 s

Men's 440 Yards Freestyle
 Noel Phillip Ryan - Gold, 4 min 39.8 s

Officials
 Honorary Manager - Hugh Richard Weir (VIC)
 Honorary Coach-Trainer - Harvey Howard Fargher (VIC)

See also
 Australia at the 1928 Summer Olympics
 Australia at the 1932 Summer Olympics

References

External links
Commonwealth Games Australia Results Database

Nations at the 1930 British Empire Games
1930
British Empire Games